The White Cloud Historic District is a  historic district in White Cloud, Kansas which was listed on the National Register of Historic Places in 1996.  It is roughly bounded by Poplar, 6th, Chesnut Sts. and K-7 and included 67 contributing buildings and a contributing site, as well as 15 non-contributing buildings and a non-contributing site.

It includes Italianate, Gothic Revival, and Greek Revival architecture.

According to the National Register nomination, the following 12 are "key contributing buildings" in the district:
Poulet House or Alexis Poulet House (1879-1880), on Poplar between 1st & 2nd, which was separately listed on the National Register in 1971
White Cloud School/St. Joseph's Church (c.1865), on Poplar between 3rd & 4th, which was separately listed on the National Register in 1973
James M. & Anna Beckett House (c.1866), at northeast corner of 2nd & Poplar
C.W. Noyes House (c.1867), at southwest corner of 2nd & Poplar
William Lynds House (1908), at southwest corner of 1st & Poplar
White Cloud Barber Shop (1864), north side of Main between 1st & 2nd Streets
Bailey & Noyes Fancy Dry Goods Store (1868–69), at northeast corner of 1st & Main.  Included as tenants a bank, then by 1905 a post office.
Sol Miller Building (1865–66), at southeast corner of 2nd & Main
Atchison & Nebraska City Railroad Depot (1871, moved in 1938), on south side of Main between K-7 & 1st.
J.E.H. Chapman House (1880), at northeast corner of 3rd & Chestnut
Springer-Campbell House (1880), at southeast corner of 3rd & Chestnut
James M. & Anna Beckett House (c.1866), at northeast corner of 2nd & Poplar.  "This National Folk, gable-front house is an excellent example of the Greek Revival vernacular."

Others include:
First State Bank building (1923), at northeast corner of 2nd & Main, which has the First State Bank of White Cloud in one half and the post office in the other.

The district overlooks the Missouri River.

References

Historic districts on the National Register of Historic Places in Kansas
Greek Revival architecture in Kansas
Gothic Revival architecture in Kansas
Italianate architecture in Kansas
Buildings and structures completed in 1868
Doniphan County, Kansas